Esplanada may refer to:

 Esplanada, municipality in the state of Bahia in the North-East region of Brazil
 Esplanada City Center, the name of a future multifunctional city center in Bucharest
 Simca Esplanada was a large car designed by the Brazilian subsidiary of French automaker Simca
 Villa Esplanada, a private housing estate in Hong Kong

See also 
 Esplanade (disambiguation)